

See also 
 United States House of Representatives elections, 1808 and 1809
 List of United States representatives from Georgia

1808
Georgia
United States House of Representatives